Carlos Alberto Pascual Lus (13 March 1931 – 12 May 2011) was a Cuban-born Major League Baseball pitcher. The ,  right-hander was signed by the Washington Senators as an amateur free agent before the 1949 season, and he played for the Senators in 1950. Nicknamed "Big Potato" (a corruption of the Spanish slang "patato", meaning short; Pascual was listed at 5'6"), he was the older brother of All-Star pitcher Camilo Pascual.

He began his professional career with the Big Spring Broncs of the Longhorn League, where he spent a season and a half. He then played for three seasons for the Havana Cubans of Florida International League and was promoted to the Washington major league squad while a member of that club.

Pascual started two games for Washington towards the end of the  season.  At 19 years of age, he was the third-youngest player to appear in an American League game in 1950. He won his first start (September 24), defeating the Philadelphia Athletics at Griffith Stadium, 3–1. He lost his second start (September 28), by a score of 4–3 to the Boston Red Sox at Fenway Park. His two-game career totals were 2 complete games, 17 innings pitched, 12 hits allowed, 3 strikeouts, 8 bases on balls, a 1–1 record, and a 2.12 ERA.

Pascual spent the rest of his 14-year career in the minor leagues where he also saw time at both shortstop and third base in addition to starting and relieving. Pascual finished his minor league career with a .323 batting average and 198 home runs and 40–32 pitching record with a 3.09 ERA in 161 games.

He died in Miami, Florida at the age of 80.

References

External links

Retrosheet – player page

1931 births
2011 deaths
Baltimore Orioles scouts
Big Spring Broncs players
Caribbean Series managers
Charlotte Hornets (baseball) players
Fort Walton Beach Jets players
Fox Cities Foxes players
Havana Cubans players
Hobbs Sports players
Kansas City Royals scouts
Lamesa Indians players
Major League Baseball pitchers
Major League Baseball players from Cuba
Cuban expatriate baseball players in the United States
Midland Indians players
Minnesota Twins scouts
New York Mets scouts
Seattle Rainiers players
Washington Senators (1901–1960) players